Sukhvinder Singh (born 23 February 1967) is an Indian former cricketer. He played first-class cricket for Assam and Delhi between 1986 and 2005.

See also
 List of Delhi cricketers

References

External links
 

1967 births
Living people
Indian cricketers
Assam cricketers
Delhi cricketers
Cricketers from Jalandhar